Sreyasri Roy is an Indian actress who works in Bengali television industry. Her notable works include: Run Rony Run, Mangal Chandi, and Bhanumotir Khel.

Television and Mahalaya

References

External links

Bengali actresses
Indian actresses
Living people
Indian television actresses
2001 births